WatchGuard, formally known as WatchGuard Technologies, Inc is a Seattle, Washington-based network security vendor. Its products are designed to protect computer networks from outside threats such as malware and ransomware.

The company was founded in 1996.

History
WatchGuard was founded in 1996 as Seattle Software Labs, Inc.  Its first product was a network firewall called the WatchGuard Security Management System, which included the WatchGuard Firebox "firewall in a box" security appliance, along with configuration and administration software.

In 1997, the company changed its name to WatchGuard Technologies, Inc.  

In July 1999, the company went public on NASDAQ.

In October 2006, the company was acquired for $151 million by private equity firms Francisco Partners and Vector Capital, and Bruce Coleman was brought on as interim CEO. 

In August 2007, Joe Wang became the company's permanent CEO, replacing Coleman.

In May 2014, CEO Wang stepped down and was replaced by interim CEO Michael Kohlsdorf, an operating partner with Francisco Partners. 

In April 2015, Kohlsdorf was succeeded as CEO by Prakash Panjwani. It was announced that both Panjwani and Kohlsdorf were joining WatchGuard's board.

In June 2016, the company acquired HawkEye G threat-detection and response technology from Hexis Cyber Solutions, now Sensage, part of KEYW Holding Corp.  In October, the company launched the WatchGuard Wi-Fi Cloud, to extend its network security to Wi-Fi networks.

In August 2017, WatchGuard acquired Datablink, a provider of multi-factor authentication software used to secure laptops, servers and other devices.

In January 2018, the company acquired Percipient Networks, a domain name system service provider.

In July 2018, the company announced an application called AuthPoint, designed to provide multi-factor authentication security for businesses.

In March 2020, WatchGuard announced an agreement to acquire Madrid-based Panda Security, a provider of network endpoint security. The deal was completed in June.

Products
The company develops security products and services for businesses. There are four product groups: Network Security, Endpoint Security, Secure Wi-Fi and Multi-Factor Authentication. 

The Network Security devices are categorized as Unified Threat Management (UTM), whereby a single device provides multiple security features. The devices include WatchGuard Dimension, a network discovery tool that allows administrators to identify devices on the network, including mobile devices; and WatchGuard cloud, giving the devices access to online threat intelligence.

The Endpoint Security offering includes products and services that provide advanced endpoint security, endpoint antivirus, security operations, and DNS level protection and content filtering.

The Secure Wi-Fi product line consists of secure indoor and outdoor Wave 1 and Wave 2 802.11ac Wi-Fi hardware, security subscription services and WatchGuard's Wi-Fi Cloud, a management platform used to control the devices.

The Multi-Factor Authentication group includes the company's AuthPoint application, a multi-factor authentication management and reporting tool which prevents unauthorized users from accessing sensitive cloud applications, VPNs and networks.

The company also issues a quarterly security report based on feed data from WatchGuard UTM appliances installed at customer sites. The report highlights the type and frequency of malicious attacks occurring on computer networks.

References

External links
 Official website

Computer security companies
Companies based in Seattle
American companies established in 1996
Networking hardware companies
Networking companies of the United States
Privately held companies based in Washington (state)